Mount Jefferson is a stratovolcano in the Cascade Volcanic Arc, part of the Cascade Range in the U.S. state of Oregon. The second highest mountain in Oregon, it is situated within Linn County, Jefferson County, and Marion County and forms part of the Mount Jefferson Wilderness. Due to the ruggedness of its surroundings, the mountain is one of the hardest volcanoes to reach in the Cascades. It is also a popular tourist destination despite its remoteness, with recreational activities including hiking, backpacking, mountaineering, and photography. Vegetation at Mount Jefferson is dominated by Douglas fir, silver fir, mountain hemlock, ponderosa pine, lodgepole pine, and several cedar species. Carnivores, insectivores, bats, rodents, deer, birds, and various other species inhabit the area.

Also known as Seekseekqua by Native American populations, the volcano was named after United States President Thomas Jefferson, and was first ascended by E. C. Cross and R. L. Farmer in 1888.  It sits atop an area of crustal melting, and was produced by the subduction of the oceanic Juan de Fuca tectonic plate under the continental North American tectonic plate, forming about 730,000 years ago. Consisting of basaltic andesite, andesite, and dacite, the mountain has been extensively altered by glacial erosion. The surrounding area contains a number of other volcanic features like cinder cones, shield volcanoes, and tuyas (flat-topped, steep-sided volcanoes formed when lava erupts through a thick glacier or ice sheet). It is considered a low threat by the United States Geological Survey. Despite the low chance of future eruptions, many scientists still consider mudflows a major threat at Mount Jefferson.

Geography 

The second tallest mountain in the U.S. state of Oregon after Mount Hood, Mount Jefferson lies within Jefferson, Linn, and Marion counties, in the central part of the state. It is not usually visible from the city of Portland, though it is visible on clear days from Salem and can be noticed from highways to both the east and the west of the Cascade Range.

Wilderness 

Mount Jefferson's eastern segment lies within the Warm Springs Indian Reservation, and its western portion within the Mount Jefferson Wilderness, of the Willamette National Forest and Deschutes National Forests. It also has  of trails, including  of the Pacific Crest National Scenic Trail. Mount Jefferson is the major feature of the wilderness, along with the nearby Three Fingered Jack volcano.

Physical geography 
Mount Jefferson lies in the temperate maritime climate of Western Oregon. The Cascades absorb east-moving moisture, causing warm and dry summers. Winters show higher precipitation levels, especially at higher elevations, averaging  at peak altitudes and consisting mostly of snow.

When Little Ice Age glaciers retreated during the 20th century, water filled in the spaces left behind, forming moraine-dammed lakes, which are more common in the Mount Jefferson Wilderness and the nearby Three Sisters Wilderness than anywhere else in the contiguous United States. A number of these lakes breached during the 20th century and inundated Jefferson Park and the Jefferson Creek drainage under Waldo Glacier. These breach events yielded floods and small lahars (volcanically induced mudslides, landslides, and debris flows).

Mount Jefferson has 35 snow and ice features, including four named glaciers: Whitewater, Jefferson Park, Russell, and Waldo. The volcano, like much of the Oregon Cascades, was likely covered by an ice cap during the Pleistocene, with the glaciers at their peak size between 25,000 and 20,000 years ago. During the 20th century, scientists thought they had identified a new glacier, which they named Milk Creek Glacier, but later studies established that it was an artifact of stagnant ice that had been hidden by debris, and it is no longer considered its own distinct feature.

Other geographic features at Jefferson include rock outcrops, steep talus slopes, conifer forests, and alpine meadows. Additionally, a number of rivers drain Mount Jefferson. The northern and northwestern slopes feed the South Fork Breitenbush River, which flows into Detroit Lake, and the eastern side of Detroit Lake also receives water from Whitewater Creek, Russell Creek, and Milk Creek, which flow from the western flank of Mount Jefferson. The Whitewater Glacier and the northeastern side of the volcano drain into the Whitewater River, and Shitike Creek flows between Mount Jefferson and Olallie Butte before reaching the Deschutes River. Both Jefferson and Parker Creeks receive water from Jefferson's southeastern slopes, then join the Metolius River.

Wildfires occur within the wilderness area at Mount Jefferson. In the late summer to early fall of 2017, the Whitewater and Little Devil fires occurred. As a result of the Whitewater fire, officials closed the Mount Jefferson Wilderness during the solar eclipse of August 21, 2017.

Ecology 

Vegetation at Mount Jefferson is dominated by Douglas fir, silver fir, mountain hemlock, ponderosa pine, lodgepole pine, and several species of cedar. Vine maple, rhododendron, purple lupine, yellow lupine, Indian paintbrush, wild strawberries, and red huckleberries are also common around Mount Jefferson.

Carnivorous animals at Mount Jefferson and its surroundings include American black bears, coyotes, cougars, red foxes, raccoons, American martens, stoats (also known as ermines), long-tailed weasels, American minks, North American river otters, and bobcats. Deer species include Roosevelt elk, black-tailed deer, and mule deer; insectivores include vagrant shrews, American water shrews, and coast moles. Bats at Jefferson include little brown bats and silver-haired bats, and American pikas and snowshoe hares are also present. Rodents such as yellow-bellied marmots, mountain beavers, yellow-pine chipmunks, Townsend's chipmunks, golden-mantled ground squirrels, western gray squirrels, Douglas squirrels, mountain pocket gophers, North American beavers, deer mice, bushy-tailed woodrats, water voles, Pacific jumping mice, and North American porcupines are present.

Birds at Jefferson include mallards, northern goshawks, sharp-shinned hawks, red-tailed hawks, dusky grouses, grey partridges, killdeers, spotted sandpipers, California gulls, band-tailed pigeons, great horned owls, mountain pygmy owls, common nighthawks, rufous hummingbirds, Northern flickers, pileated woodpeckers, yellow-bellied sapsuckers, hairy woodpeckers, and white-headed woodpeckers. Other bird species found in the area consist of Eurasian three-toed woodpeckers, willow flycatchers, olive-sided flycatchers, tree swallows, Canada jays, Steller's jays, common ravens, Clark's nutcrackers, black-capped chickadees, mountain chickadees, chestnut-backed chickadees, red-breasted nuthatches, pygmy nuthatches, Eurasian treecreepers, American dippers, wrens, American robins, varied thrushes, hermit thrushes, Townsend's solitaires, golden-crowned kinglets, ruby-crowned kinglets, water pipits, blue-headed vireos, western tanagers, Cassin's finches, gray-crowned rosy finches, pine siskins, red crossbills, green-tailed towhees, dark-eyed juncos, white-crowned sparrows, golden-crowned sparrows, fox sparrows, and Lincoln's sparrows. Long-toed salamanders, California giant salamanders, rough-skinned newts, tailed frogs, western toads, Pacific tree frogs, northern red-legged frogs, Oregon spotted frogs, pygmy short-horned lizards, common garter snakes, and northwestern garter snakes make up some of the amphibious and reptilian animals in the vicinity. Roughly half the lakes in the Jefferson area contain rainbow trout.

Geology 

Mount Jefferson shows normal magnetic polarity, suggesting that it formed less than 730,000 years ago. Jefferson does not lie in one of these grabens, but these tectonic processes continue, albeit at a less dramatic rate.

The central Oregon Cascades are made up of Eocene to Quaternary volcanic, volcaniclastic, igneous, and sedimentary rock. Miocene and Pliocene volcanic and sedimentary rocks have been exposed in the Jefferson area, which also sits above lava flows, cinder material, and breccia from the High Cascades that formed during and after the Pliocene. Jefferson is the largest volcano in the Jefferson Reach, which forms the  strip that makes up the northern part of the Oregon Cascade Range. Stretching from Frog Lake Buttes to South Cinder Peak, this segment consists of at least 175 Quaternary volcanoes. Other unusual features of the Jefferson Reach include that the northernmost  of the strip does not contain many volcanoes formed since the early Pleistocene and that it features a number of andesitic and dacitic volcanoes, which are unlike the many mafic (rich in magnesium and iron) shield volcanoes within the stretch. South of Pinhead Buttes, the Cascades becomes younger Pleistocene volcanoes, which often have glaciers.

The melting of the metamorphic rocks amphibolite and at deeper strata, granulite, have both produced intermediate and silicic lavas at Jefferson. The strip may still be active, as monogenetic vents near Jefferson have produced basaltic andesite since the last glacial period. Jefferson — with Mount Hood, the Three Sisters-Broken Top area, and Crater Lake — represents one of four volcanic centers responsible for much of the Oregon Cascades' Quaternary andesite, dacite, and rhyolite deposits. Some of this andesite and dacite occurs in vents that underlie the Jefferson vicinity, which also erupted during the Quaternary.

In the area surrounding Mount Jefferson, monogenetic volcanoes constructed an upland area composed of basaltic lava flows and small volcanic vents. Within this region, basaltic vents occur at Olallie Butte, Potato Butte, Sisi Butte, North Cinder Peak, and South Cinder Peak, with basaltic lava flows at Cabot Creek, Jefferson Creek, and upper Puzzle Creek. Mount Jefferson overlies an silicic volcanic field from the early Pleistocene.
Scientists think that the setup of this field, where various vents have erupted lava, explains why the otherwise similar Cascades volcano at Mount Hood is three times as voluminous as Jefferson, because Hood has concentrated most of the eruptions from its magma chambers. The field is also likely underlain by a batholith, a large mass of intrusive igneous rock (also called a pluton) that forms from cooled magma deep in the Earth's crust.

Mount Jefferson is a stratovolcano, made up of basaltic andesite, andesite, and dacite overlying basaltic shield volcanoes, with andesite and more silicic (rich in silica) rock forming the majority of the mountain. Rhyolite from the Quaternary can also be found at Jefferson, though it is not commonly found within the major volcanic centers of the Oregon Cascades. Mount Jefferson has been significantly altered by erosion, and represents one of the most eroded stratovolcanoes in the state of Oregon. Glacial motion during the Pleistocene decreased the summit's elevation by a few hundred feet and formed a cirque (an amphitheatre-like valley carved by glacial erosion) on the western side of the volcano. This feature, known as the West Milk Creek cirque, includes the two Milk Creek glaciers and extends into the interior of Mount Jefferson, exposing tephra and pyroclastic rock in the main volcanic cone. Currently, the Whitewater Glacier and the Milk Creek glaciers erode the mountain's eastern and western flanks, respectively, and are likely to gradually form a cleft between the northern and southern horns of the summit.

The volcano also possess a small volcanic plug (created when magma hardens within a vent on an active volcano), situated  under the summit. Jefferson's main cone ranges from 58 to 64 percent silicon dioxide, and is mostly made up of andesite and dacite. The upper  of Jefferson's  cone formed within the past 100,000 years, and consists mostly of dacite lava flows and lava domes. While it is possible that glaciers shed material from the burgeoning lava domes, any evidence of these domes generating pyroclastic flows or lahars has not been preserved in the geological record.

Basalt at Mount Jefferson contains olivine, clinopyroxene, and plagioclase phenocryst crystals, while basaltic andesite phenocrysts include plagioclase (variable among samples), clinopyroxene, olivine, orthopyroxene, and occasionally, magnetite. Dacite and rhyodacite samples show amphibole, plagioclase, orthopyroxene, clinopyroxene, magnetite, apatite, and every so often ilmenite. Andesite shows similar composition to dacite samples, though sodic plagioclases and amphiboles are not as common.

Subfeatures 

Volcanic activity in the vicinity of Mount Jefferson tends to originate from either stratovolcanoes that erupt for thousands of years or monogenetic volcanoes, which only erupt for brief periods of time. At least 35 volcanic vents can be detected within  of the main volcanic cone at Mount Jefferson. These have produced andesitic and dacitic lava flows, lava domes, small shield volcanoes, and lava aprons. Basalt lava flows, at least two of which are younger than 7,700 years old, have been produced from four monogenetic volcanoes  to the south of Jefferson, and they are not directly related to activity at the Mount Jefferson volcano. Rhyodacitic lava flows and pyroclastic material, which have since been significantly altered and stripped by glaciation, originated from eight vents in the area.

The area is full of cinder cone volcanoes and intrusive lava plugs, which occur in irregular patterns. Made up of red to gray cinders, some are loose and agglutinated, and some contain intrusive rock plugs, while others do not. Cinder cones south of Mount Jefferson erupted lava flows, such as Forked Butte and North Cinder Peak. About 1,000 years ago, the South Cinder Peak cinder cone erupted, generating a lava flow that reached Marion Lake. Other volcanic cones associated with Mount Jefferson include Forked Butte and Horseshoe Cone.

Eruptive history 

Scientists lack a comprehensive record of activity at Mount Jefferson, as important details have been obscured by the erosion of deposits by large glaciers. A few eruptions have been documented from the deposits that have been preserved, but the broad outline of Jefferson's eruptive history is understood, including that its activity has changed over time, producing both powerful explosive eruptions and lava flows. Historically, eruptive activity has alternated between andesitic and dacitic lavas.

The volcano formed over the course of several eruptive episodes, beginning about 300,000 years ago with the formation of rocks on the western and southwestern flanks of the volcano, and lasting until roughly 15,000 years ago. The two major eruptive episodes were separated by glacial erosion of the volcano. At least during the past 700,000 years, eruptions at the volcano have produced andesitic and dacitic lava. Most of the volcano formed within the past 100,000 years, with the latest activity building the central volcanic cone taking place between 30,000 and 20,000 years ago. These eruptions took place amidst the last glacial period and indicate interaction of lava with ice. They erupted dacite lava flows and silicic lava domes from vents east of the former central cone, and were influenced by ice on Mount Jefferson, which prevented them from diffusing across the volcano's flanks. Instead, they formed lava tongues near the crater and coursed down spaces in between glaciers, creating volcanic glass and columnar joints, or arrays of prismatic shapes. Silicic lava domes from this eruptive episode collapsed over and over again, producing block-and-ash flows, or pyroclastic flows with many volcanic blocks among ash with a similar composition.

About 150,000 years ago, an eruption produced the volcanic rock in the Park Butte area. A huge explosive eruption took place between 100,000 and 35,000 years ago (scientists have been unable to create a more specific time frame for the event), producing ash layers that covered the Metolius and Deschutes River valleys and eventually extended to the city of Arco, in the southeastern part of the state of Idaho. This eruption may have excavated the existing crater, but if that were the case, eruptions have since refilled the area and obscured evidence of a crater-forming event. Eruptions around the same time period yielded pyroclastic flows that coursed down the Whitewater River drainage of the eastern side of Mount Jefferson, and the Whitewater Creek on the volcano's western flank.

Basaltic lava flows at Forked Butte and to the south of Bear Butte mark the newest lava flows in the Jefferson area, as both were produced after Mount Mazama erupted roughly 7,600 years ago.

The last eruption occurred about a thousand years ago at a cinder cone on the flank of the South Cinder Peak cone.

Recent activity and potential hazards 
The basaltic lava flows produced from four monogenetic vents near Mount Jefferson indicate that the local region could produce future eruptions and could be considered active. Mount Jefferson itself is listed with a "Low/Very Low" threat potential by the United States Geological Survey, but the agency has noted that "it may be too soon to regard Mount Jefferson as extinct." In a 1987 report, Richard P. Hoblitt and other USGS scientists estimated that the yearly likelihood for a major explosive eruption at Jefferson does not exceed 1 in 100,000. However, given the incomplete geologic record, imprecise dating of its known deposits, and its lack of relatively recent activity, scientists from the United States Geological Survey have commented that "It is almost impossible to estimate the probability of future eruptions at Mount Jefferson." They have designated proximal and distal hazard zones for the volcano, which extend  and several tens of miles, respectively.

An eruption from the volcano would threaten the immediate surrounding area, in addition to places downstream near river valleys or downwind that could be affected by ashfall. Lahars (volcanically induced mudslides, landslides, and debris flows) and tephra could extend far from the volcano, and Mount Jefferson may also produce pyroclastic flows, lava domes, and lava flows.

Lava flows from Mount Jefferson or another volcano nearby might form lava domes that could collapse, also yielding pyroclastic flows. Moreover, while basaltic lava flows from surrounding monogenetic vents tend to travel slowly and typically only reach  from their source, and therefore would not pose serious hazards to much wildlife or humans, they would still burn and bury anything they encountered. Mazama Ash in the region reached  in thickness, and at least one explosive eruption from Jefferson deposited  of ash onto its surroundings within . Finer ash particles from the volcano could threaten air traffic, as a large gas plume may form; clouds from such a plume might also spawn pyroclastic flows on the flanks of the Jefferson volcano. Moreover, ash can cause irritation of the eyes or respiratory system among the ill, the elderly, and infants, potentially leading to chronic lung disease. Tephra can also lead to the short-circuiting of electric transformers and power lines, collapse roofs, clog engine filters, damage car engines, and create clouds capable of producing lightning that can start fires. Even monogenetic volcanoes in the area could yield hazardous ashfall, reaching  in thickness in areas within ; it is unlikely they would threaten areas outside the local Jefferson vicinity.

An eruption at Jefferson could create lahars that would reach Detroit Lake on the western side of the volcano or Lake Billy Chinook on the eastern side, leading to increased lake water levels (or lake dam failure) and endangering life downstream. In addition to the hazards from eruptions at Mount Jefferson, other safety threats include debris avalanches and lahars, which could be caused without an eruption as a result of the failure of glacial moraine dams; this has happened in the past at Jefferson. Even a small or mid-sized landslide could create lahars that travel far from the volcano. Flooding at one of the many lakes on the flanks of Jefferson could spawn lahars in the future. Many scientists think mudflows represent the largest threat at Jefferson.

Seismic activity at Mount Jefferson is monitored by a regional network of seismic meters operated by the United States Geological Survey at the University of Washington's Geophysics Department. No frequent signs of detectable earthquake have been seen within the past two decades, but if earthquakes increased, scientists are prepared to deploy additional seismometers and other tools to monitor volcanic gas emissions and ground deformation indicating movement of magma into the volcano.

Human history 

A Native American name for the mountain is Seekseekqua; its English name, Mount Jefferson (originally called Mount Vancouver by the British) was decided in honor of U.S. President Thomas Jefferson by the Lewis and Clark Expedition. The expedition, which was sponsored by President Jefferson, first saw the peak from the mouth of the Willamette River on March 30, 1806. Walter Eaton later described Mount Jefferson as "the most remote, the most inaccessible and alluring" mountain in Oregon, writing that Jefferson and Mount Hood "seem to hold mystic converse with one another over the canyons between."

Mount Jefferson's glaciers were named by Oregon Bureau of Mines scientist Ira A. Williams in 1915, with former professor of geology at the University of Oregon, Edwin T. Hodge, publishing a report on the volcano's glaciers and geology in 1925. His report focused on the sequence of volcanic rocks at Jefferson, in addition to its physiography and glaciology. Aerial photographic surveys of the glaciers at Jefferson were conducted by the Mazamas, a hiking club from Portland, during the 20th century. In 1937, Thayer analyzed Mount Jefferson's petrography and petrology from segments of the Western Cascades and High Cascades, which he separated into local units. He expanded on this research in a 1939 publication looking at Jefferson vicinity lava flows. Field work followed in summer during 1965, led by G. W. Walker, and a 1974 study of the volcano's glacial and volcanic history was carried out by Kenneth G. Sutton and other geologists.

The first ascent of Mount Jefferson was probably accomplished by E. C Cross and Ray L. Farmer on 12 August 1888 by way of the south ridge.  George J. Pearce, who accompanied Cross and Farmer on the expedition, wrote an account of the climb for the Oregonian newspaper on 22 August 1900.  The first climber to reach the summit via the north face was S. S. Mohler in 1903.

Recreation 

Mount Jefferson is remote, and can usually only be reached on foot or by horse. There are no paved roads within  of the mountain, and it is relatively little-known compared to other features near the Willamette Valley. Still, the mountain and its surrounding wilderness are visited by so many hikers, backpackers, and climbers each year, especially during the summer, that they face threats to their ecological well-being. The Warm Springs Tribal Council does not permit access to the volcano's eastern side, so only the western flanks can be used by the public. The western side can be reached from the Oregon Route 22 highway.

Located within the Mount Jefferson Wilderness, it represents a popular tourist destination for its views, lakes, and meadows, with activities including backpacking, climbing, and hiking during the summer, as well as nature photography. The area contains 26 campsites, which enforce a maximum group size of 12 people, and do not allow campfires. As a result of increased traffic to the area between 2012 and 2014, the Willamette National Forest administration enforced a campsite reservation system as of 2016, but stopped the practice in 2017 due to its failure to reduce human impact within the region.

Parts of the Trail were destroyed by a fire in the wilderness area in 2003, but the surviving remnants of the trail reopened after maintenance work was completed. These and other trails through the region offer views of the devastation of fires in the wilderness area in 2003 and 2006. The Whitewater Trail runs north through the wilderness area for  before reaching a junction, with the right path moving  to the Pacific Crest Trail. In the Maxwell trail area, hikes of all difficulty levels can be found, including the challenging Maxwell Butte Trail 3391, the  round trip at Santiam Lake Trail 3491, and the slightly less demanding  Duffy Lake Trail 3427. At the Pamelia Lake trail area, there are streams, lakes, and springs, as well as bathrooms, parking areas, and picnic tables. The Pamelia Limited Entry Area only allows 20 groups per day and limits their size to mitigate human impacts on the wilderness. Trails at Pamelia Lake include the Hunts Creek Trail 3440 and a segment of the Pacific Crest Trail, in addition to the Pamelia Lake Trail 3439, which rises  before meeting the Hunts Creek Trail. The area is popular for backpacking, mountaineering, horseback riding, and day hiking. Other popular trails include the Firecamp Lakes Trail and Canyon Creek Meadows trails. In addition to the trails, some of the most popular areas around Mount Jefferson Wilderness include Eight Lakes Basin, Pamelia Lake, Jack Lake, Duffy Lake, Russell Lake, Santiam Lake and Wasco Lake.

Mount Jefferson can be climbed, but the route is challenging, especially the pinnacle of the summit. Nearly annually, at least one climber attempting Jefferson perishes. Because of the hazards and difficulty of climbing Mount Jefferson, the U.S. National Geodetic Survey recommends that only experienced climbers try to climb it.

See also
 Cascade Volcanoes
 Geology of the Pacific Northwest

References

Sources

External links

 

Cascade Range
Cascade Volcanoes
Landforms of Jefferson County, Oregon
Landforms of Marion County, Oregon
Mountains of Linn County, Oregon
Mountains of Oregon
North American 3000 m summits
Stratovolcanoes of the United States
Subduction volcanoes
Volcanoes of Linn County, Oregon
Volcanoes of Oregon
Pleistocene stratovolcanoes